Ringed Nunatak is a small but conspicuous nunatak located in the icefall at the head of Gatlin Glacier, in the Cumulus Hills of Antarctica. So named by the Texas Tech Shackleton Glacier Expedition (1964–65) because a ring of moraine completely surrounds the nunatak.
 

Nunataks of the Ross Dependency
Dufek Coast